East Texas is a broadly defined cultural, geographic, and ecological region in the eastern part of the U.S. state of Texas that comprises most of 41 counties. It is primarily divided into Northeast and Southeast Texas. Most of the region consists of the Piney Woods ecoregion. East Texas can sometimes be defined only as the Piney Woods. At the fringes, towards Central Texas, the forests expand outward toward sparser trees and eventually into open plains.

According to the Handbook of Texas, the East Texas area "may be separated from the rest of Texas roughly by a line extending from the Red River in north-central Lamar County southwestward to east-central Limestone County and then southeastward towards eastern Galveston Bay". Most sources separate the Gulf Coast area into a separate region.

Another popular, somewhat simpler, definition defines East Texas as the region between the Trinity River, north and east of Houston (or sometimes Interstate 45, when defining generously) as the western border; the Louisiana border as the eastern border; the Gulf of Mexico as the southern border; the Oklahoma border as the northern border; Arkansas as the northeastern border, and extending as far south as Orange, Texas. The East Texas region includes Tyler, Longview, Texarkana, Lufkin, Marshall, Palestine, Henderson, Jacksonville, Mount Pleasant, and Nacogdoches as principal cities in addition to the Houston and Beaumont metropolitan statistical areas.

Geography 

Climate is the unifying factor in the region's geography; all of East Texas has the humid subtropical climate typical of the Southeast, occasionally interrupted by intrusions of cold air from the north. East Texas receives more rainfall, than the rest of Texas. However, Houston has slightly warmer winters than most of East Texas due to its lower latitude and proximity to the coast.

All of East Texas lies within the Gulf Coastal Plain. It has less uniformity of climate than the rolling hills in the north and flat coastal plains in the south. Local vegetation varies from north to south, with the lower third consisting of the temperate grassland extending from South Texas to South Louisiana and the northern two-thirds of the region dominated by the temperate forest known as the Piney Woods. The Piney Woods are part of a much larger region of pine-hardwood forest that extends into Louisiana, Arkansas, and Oklahoma. The Piney Woods area thins out as it nears the Gulf of Mexico. West of the Piney Woods are the ranchlands and remnant oak forests of the East Central Texas forests ecoregion.

The Sabine, Trinity, Neches, Angelina and Sulphur rivers are the major rivers in East Texas, but the Brazos and Red rivers also flow through the region. The Brazos cuts through the southwest portion of the region, while the Red River forms its northern border with Oklahoma and a portion of Arkansas. In East Texas and the rest of the South, small rivers and creeks collect into swamps called bayous and merge with the surrounding forest. Bald cypress and Spanish moss are the dominant plants in bayous. The most famous of these bayous are Cypress Bayou and Buffalo Bayou. Cypress Bayou surrounds the Big, Little, and Black Cypress rivers around Jefferson. They flow east into Caddo Lake, and the adjoining wetlands cover the rim and islands of the lake.

Deep East Texas 
Deep East Texas is a subregion of East Texas, alongside Northeast and Southeast Texas. According to the Deep East Texas Council of Governments, the region consists of the following twelve counties: Angelina, Houston, Jasper, Nacogdoches, Newton, Polk, Sabine, San Augustine, San Jacinto, Shelby, Trinity, and Tyler.

The "Deep" designation comes from the similarity to East Texas (it is similar in culture and topography, being highly forested), but with a location "deeper" (i.e., farther south and towards the Gulf Coast) than the rest of East Texas.

"Deep" also refers to the cultural and social characteristics of the area. This is considered synonymous to the "Big Thicket", an allusion to the dense growth of underbrush in the Piney Woods. It was the earliest area of Texas to be settled by Anglo-Americans from the United States (and one of the last areas to submit to law enforcement—by the governments of New Spain, Mexico, the Republic of Texas, the state of Texas, or the United States). Well into the first quarter of the 20th century, renegade clans controlled local governments, especially in Shelby County.

The area contains two of the oldest towns in Texas; Nacogdoches, the oldest town in Texas, dating from the 18th century, and San Augustine, the oldest "British-American" settlement in Texas, dating from the 1820s. People of English, Scottish, Scots-Irish, and to a lesser extent Welsh ancestry predominate in this  region, because of the history of settlement. This is in contrast to West Texas and South Central Texas,  where people of Hispanic and German ancestry predominate, respectively. Hispanic settlers are descended from colonists of New Spain, dating from the 16th and 17th centuries. Most of the German immigrant ancestors in Central Texas arrived after the Revolutions of 1848. 

The Spanish and later Mexican governments did not want settlers from the United States until after Mexico had gained independence. East Texas had been barely settled by Spanish and Mexican colonists, and the government decided to allow immigration from the US to bolster defenses against raiding by the Apache and Comanche. Neither government was able to exert much control or law enforcement in the area. As a consequence, the "Big Thicket" became a refuge for criminals fleeing the United States and hiding out in a "no man's land" in the pine tree thickets.

The Pine Curtain 
The early isolation of the region and its links to the Deep South have resulted in the piney woods being described as a 'curtain' that demarcates a certain cultural enclave or bubble that distinguishes East Texas from the rest of the state. Former residents describe living behind the 'Pine Curtain' as a form of escape. The phrase is often used to describe the area; it appeared in a newspaper column in the Palestine Herald-Press, and in a late 20th-century tourist guide by Mike Dougan.

Demography 

East Texas comprises 41 counties, 38 of which collaborate in sub-regional Ark-Tex Council of Governments, the East Texas Council of Governments, the Deep East Texas Council of Governments, and the South East Texas Regional Planning Commission.

Counties generally included are Anderson, Angelina, Bowie, Camp, Cass, Cherokee, Delta, Franklin, Gregg, Hardin, Harrison, Henderson, Hopkins, Houston, Jasper, Jefferson, Lamar, Marion, Morris, Nacogdoches, Newton, Orange, Panola, Polk, Rains, Red River, Rusk, Sabine, San Augustine, San Jacinto, Shelby, Smith, Titus, Trinity, Tyler, Upshur, Van Zandt, and Wood County, Texas. Harris County and those forming the Greater Houston metropolitan area are sometimes included in varying sources, such as the Texas Department of Transportation, or more generally, Southeast Texas.

The three additional East Texas counties that join with other regional government councils are Chambers County (Anahuac), Liberty County (Liberty), and Walker County (Huntsville), all three in geographic proximity to the Houston metropolitan area.

Outside of the Greater Houston area, the average population density is around 18–45 per mi2 (7–12 per km2), with the population density near the Big Thicket dropping below 18 people per mi2. East Texas's population total is very large and is centered around the Golden Triangle (Texas) of Beaumont/Port Arthur/Orange in Southeast Texas. Moving north from the coast, Lufkin and Nacogdoches anchor the population center of Deep East Texas. Continuing north from Deep East Texas, Tyler, Longview, and Marshall, in Northeast Texas, along with Texarkana, on the far northeastern border with Arkansas, represent the major population centers in the northern section of East Texas.  Eight miles from the Texas border, Shreveport, Louisiana, is considered the economic and cultural center for the Ark-La-Tex, the area where Arkansas, Louisiana, and East Texas meet.

According to the 2010 U.S. census, these 41 East Texas counties had a total population of 2,057,518 residents. This represented 8% of the total state population of Texas.

Per the 2010 census records, the five most populous counties were:

 Jefferson County (252,273)
 Smith County (209,714)
 Gregg County (121,730)
 Bowie County (92,565)
 Angelina County (86,771)

Per the 2010 census, the ten most populous East Texas cities outside of Houston's metro area were:

 Beaumont (118,296)
 Tyler (98,564)
 Longview (81,336)
 Port Arthur (53,937)
 Huntsville (38,548) (Huntsville, Walker County, Texas is not of the above 41 listed counties of East Texas.)
 Texarkana (36,411) (TX side only, 66,330 when combined with Texarkana, AR)
 Lufkin (35,067)
 Nacogdoches (32,996)
 Paris (25,151)
 Marshall (23,523)

In 2010, the population of East Texas counties was 65.93% non-Hispanic white, 17.44% African American, 14.29% Hispanic or Latino American, and 2.34% other (including Native American and Asian). East Texas's most ethnically and racially diverse county was Jefferson County, its largest county. This includes the city of Beaumont, with 44.1% non-Hispanic whites, 34.1% African Americans, 17.7% Hispanic or Latinos of any race, and 4.1% other races or ethnicities (including Native American and Asian). 

East Texas is within the Black Belt region, the fertile area that was the  center of cotton culture and enslaved African-American labor. 

Unlike Texas's total state racial demographics, only two counties in East Texas outside of Greater Houston's sphere had a majority minority. Jefferson County in the Golden Triangle and Titus County have a 40.6% Hispanic or Latino population. East Texas and Southeast Texas in particular, which had been areas of cotton plantation before the Civil War, have a significant African-American population, ranging to nearly 20% in some counties.

Culture 

East Texas is often considered the westernmost extension of the Deep South. The predominant cultural influence comes from customs and traditions passed down from European American and African American Southerners who settled the region during the mid-to-late 19th century. African Americans were first brought to the area as enslaved workers to develop and cultivate commodity crops on plantations. Harrison County had the most plantations and highest number of slaves in the antebellum period. Deep South accent influences are noticeable in the subdialect of Texan English that is spoken throughout the region. According to the most recent linguistic studies, East Texans tend to pronounce Southern English with the drawl typical of the Lower South. Other parts of Texas are more apt to use the "twang" of the Upper South, or—depending upon demographic influences of the particular area—with some Hispanic and Midwestern traits.

East Texas lacks the strong influence of late 19th-and early 20th-century European immigrants from Germany and central Europe. Similarly, the new waves of immigrants since the late 20th century, primarily from India, other Asian nations, and Latin America, and their influences, have been less prevalent in East Texas compared to other Texas regions.

East Texans are predominantly Protestant Christians. They are members of many denominations as part of the Bible Belt. The most numerous Christian adherents have included the Baptists, particularly the Southern Baptist Convention (majority white) and National Baptist Convention USA (majority black, formed after the Civil War); Methodists and Presbyterians; Lutherans and classical Pentecostals; and others. 

Roman Catholicism continues to have influence, particularly given the increased Hispanic or Latino American population in recent decades. The largest Catholic jurisdictions in the region has been the Roman Catholic Archdiocese of Galveston-Houston in Southeast Texas, and the Roman Catholic Diocese of Tyler in the northeastern subregion. 

Other religious faiths with smaller numbers, but with adherents in East Texas, include Mormonism and Judaism.

Significant numbers of people of Cajun and Creole descent have migrated from Louisiana, although most are assimilated partially or completely into East Texas culture (adopting the local culture, and losing to varying degrees, their original culture). This assimilation pattern has often historically included conversion from Roman Catholicism, associated with French and Spanish traditions, to Protestant denominations. 

United States settlers from the Protestant Southeast practiced some discrimination against Cajun and Creole migrants, a cultural attitude that persisted until quite recently. Despite the tendency toward assimilation, Cajun and Creole cuisine (for example, jambalaya and catfish gumbo), are popular in the region. Many East Texans, including those without Louisiana roots, are known to be expert at preparing at least some well-known Louisiana dishes.

While some East Texans associate with cowboy culture, most identify more with smaller scale farming of the Southern U.S., than with the expansive cattle ranching of the plains regions of Texas. But East Texans commonly own and trade cattle. Several "sale barns" exist across East Texas, with weekly and monthly trades, as is common in other parts of the Deep South.

In the northern part of East Texas, awareness of the native and historical Caddo Mississippian culture remains significant. Cherokee County is home to the Caddo Mounds State Historic Site. Patrons can also view the "Caddo Indian Collection" at the Gregg County Historical Museum in Longview. In the mid-1800s, East Texas cities such as Marshall and Jefferson constituted a sphere of influence that led the entire state into the Confederacy. East Texas was the aread of powerful planters and the most significant numbers of slaveholders. 

Before that, during the Mexican and Republic periods, Nacogdoches and San Augustine were the most developed and influential cities in East Texas. Many East Texans have a mixture of European and Native American ancestry, as seen in East Texan country artists Miranda Lambert and Kacey Musgraves. The Museum of East Texas opened in Lufkin in 1976 under the name Lufkin Historical and Creative Arts Center.

Music 

East Texas is home to the Texas Country Music Hall of Fame, located in Carthage. East Texans enjoy a range of music that is influenced by gospel, bluegrass, blues, rock, country, soul, rhythm and blues, Cajun, etc. Texas blues originated in East Texas, with many legends having been born in the region, including Lightnin' Hopkins and T-Bone Walker. East Texans enjoy live music at many of the region's fairs and festivals, including the Texas Rose Festival in Tyler, the East Texas Yamboree in Gilmer, and Longview's Great Texas Balloon Race. 

East Texas also has many venues included in what is commonly referred to as the Texas country music circuit, although the majority of such venues are located in Central/South/West Texas and the metropolitan areas of the state.

Many notable music artists have East Texas roots, including: George Jones (Saratoga), Miranda Lambert (Lindale), Kacey Musgraves (Mineola), Jamie Foxx, (Terrell), Neal McCoy (Longview and Jacksonville), Lee Ann Womack (Jacksonville), Janis Joplin (Port Arthur), UGK (Port Arthur), Don Henley (Linden), Ray Price (Perryville), Johnny Horton (Rusk), Johnny Mathis (Gilmer), Tex Ritter (Panola County), Jim Reeves (Panola County), Mark Chesnutt (Beaumont), Tracy Byrd (Vidor), Clay Walker (Beaumont), T-Bone Walker (Linden), Chris Tomlin (Grand Saline), and Michelle Shocked (Gilmer), among many others.

Worldwide-acclaimed pianist Van Cliburn, a native of nearby Shreveport, Louisiana, was raised in Kilgore. Kilgore College houses the Van Cliburn Auditorium on its home campus.

Many high-school bands in East Texas continue the tradition of military-style marching, unlike other parts of the state. These bands compete in the National Association Of Military Marching Bands.

Sports and outdoors 
As with other parts of Texas, high school football is the most popular local sport venue in East Texas. Residents of East Texas towns and rural communities fill high-school stadiums in support of their local teams, cheerleaders, bands, etc. Many East Texas high-school teams have won Texas state championships, along with producing many collegiate and professional football players.

Earl Campbell, the "Tyler Rose", played football for John Tyler High in Tyler before playing for the Texas Longhorns and the Houston Oilers. Don Meredith, who famously played for the Dallas Cowboys, played at Mt. Vernon. Dez Bryant, a football player from Lufkin, formerly played wide receiver for the Dallas Cowboys before signing with the New Orleans Saints (then getting injured three days afterwards). Adrian Peterson, a star running back for the Minnesota Vikings, played high-school football in Palestine. Many other high-school sports are popular in East Texas, including basketball, baseball, volleyball, softball, and track.

A significant number of East Texan youths participate in Little League Baseball, soccer, and softball. Church leagues are quite common in providing opportunities for basketball and softball for youth and adults alike. In recent years, cowboy churches have grown in number and offer rodeo events for their youth.

East Texans also enjoy collegiate athletic competition. Most residents support collegiate teams located in other regions of the state; the Texas A&M Aggies, Texas Longhorns, Texas Tech Red Raiders, Baylor Bears, TCU Horned Frogs, etc. Including the city of Houston, its Houston Cougars are another prominent collegiate team. Due to proximity to neighboring states, East Texas has a substantial number of fans of the LSU Tigers, Arkansas Razorbacks, Oklahoma State Cowboys, and Oklahoma Sooners. The Battle of the Piney Woods is a fiercely contested sports rivalry between the Bearkats of Sam Houston State University in Huntsville and the Lumberjacks of Stephen F. Austin State University  in Nacogdoches. Both compete in the FCS level of NCAA athletic competition as members of the Southland Conference. The Cardinals of Lamar University in Beaumont also compete with Stephen F. Austin and Sam Houston State in the Southland Conference.

Other universities and colleges that field athletic teams in East Texas include East Texas Baptist University Tigers in Marshall; University of Texas at Tyler Patriots in Tyler; LeTourneau University Yellowjackets in Longview; Texas A&M–Commerce Lions; and several junior colleges throughout the region, which participate in the Southwest Junior College Conference in Region XIV of the NJCAA. East Texas is also home to the Kilgore College Rangerettes, a world-famous dance team that debuted in 1939.

A few professional sports teams are located in the traditionally defined East Texas. The East Texas Pump Jacks, located in Kilgore, play baseball in the Texas Collegiate League. Additionally, the East Texas Storm, a semiprofessional football team located in Tyler, competes in the Lone Star Minor League. Typically, northern parts of East Texas tend to support the professional teams from the Dallas/Fort Worth area in North Texas (Dallas Cowboys, Dallas Mavericks, Texas Rangers, Dallas Stars), while southern parts of East Texas tend to support professional teams from the Houston area in Southeast Texas (Houston Texans, Houston Rockets, Houston Astros).

As with other parts of Texas and/or the Southern U.S., other popular sporting activities in East Texas include rodeo (including PRCA), hunting, and fishing. Prominent rodeos in East Texas are held in Beaumont, Nacogdoches, Paris,  Longview, Gladewater, Huntsville, Lufkin, Athens, Palestine, Lindale, etc. East Texas contains several award-winning lakes for sport fishing, including Toledo Bend Reservoir, Lake Sam Rayburn, Lake Livingston, Lake Fork Reservoir, Lake Tawakoni, etc.

East Texas also contains numerous golf courses and avid golfers, as well as NASCAR fans. However, the region does not host professional events in either of those sports. The nearest NASCAR track to East Texas is Texas Motor Speedway in Fort Worth.

East Texans enjoy many Texas state parks, including Caddo Lake, Atlanta, Daingerfield, Lake Bob Sandlin, Tyler, Mission Tejas in Grapeland, Cooper Lake, Lake Tawakoni, Martin Creek, Huntsville, Lake Sam Rayburn, Lake Livingston and Sea Rim among others.  East Texas is also home to the Angelina National Forest, Davy Crockett National Forest, Sam Houston National Forest, Sabine National Forest, Big Thicket National Preserve, Trinity River National Wildlife Refuge, Anahuac National Wildlife Refuge, and McFaddin National Wildlife Refuge.

Economy 

Historically, the East Texas economy has been led by lumber, cotton, cattle, and oil. Prior to the discovery of the East Texas Oil Field, cotton, lumber and cattle were the predominant source of economic growth and stability. The needs of local farmers contributed greatly to the establishment of local towns and trading posts. As with many parts of the nation, the chosen paths of railroads often determined the continuation of many towns.  At the beginning of the 20th century, the oil fields were discovered and oil became accessible, changing the future of the region.

In the decades leading to the new millennium, crude oil production in the East Texas Oil Field, the largest oil field in the United States, somewhat decreased. In turn, the number of high-paying jobs for uneducated workers also decreased. During the 20th century, local groceries, general stores, and cafes were replaced with franchise department stores, retail chains, and fast-food restaurants. Due to the decline of oil production, many small towns closed cafés and gas stations, some of which were replaced with cash loan shops and pawn shops. In 2022, East Texas was highlighted for its diversifying economy penetrating Deep East Texas with the decline in crude oil. Additionally, the region has become home to many patent-holding companies, due to its legal system being particularly friendly to patent holders and hostile to out-of-state tech defendants. In 2009, Paul Knight of the Houston Press stated in an article, "some say natural gas has surpassed crude as king in East Texas."

Tourism has not been a highly significant source of economic activity in the majority of East Texas, although several high-traffic corridors pass through East Texas, which have aided economic development along those routes.  These include: Interstate 30 (from Dallas through Texarkana), Interstate 20 (through Dallas and on through Shreveport), Interstate 10 (through Houston and Beaumont into Louisiana), Interstate 45 (through Houston up to Dallas), and U.S. Highway 59 (through Houston and north past Texarkana; in process of being upgraded along most of the route to Interstate 69).

Notable people 

 Sandy Duncan, Henderson, Rusk County and Tyler, Smith County
 George Foreman, Marshall, Harrison County
 Jamie Foxx, Terrell, Kaufman County
 Sam Houston, former president of the Republic of Texas, former governor of Texas, retired in Huntsville, Walker County
 Lady Bird Johnson, former First Lady of the United States, born in Karnack, Harrison County
 Joe R. Lansdale, award-winning author and martial arts expert, born in Gladewater, Gregg County
 Richard Linklater, film-maker, Huntsville, Walker County
 Margo Martindale, award-winning actress, Jacksonville, Cherokee County
 Matthew McConaughey, Longview, Gregg County
 Lonnie "Bo" Pilgrim, founder of Pilgrim's Pride Chicken, Pittsburg, Camp County
 Ross Perot, former U.S. presidential candidate born in Texarkana, Bowie County
 Adrian Peterson, Palestine, Anderson county
 Tye Sheridan, Elkhart, Anderson County
 Carroll Shelby, racer and car developer known for Shelby Cobra and numerous Ford and Chrysler products, Leesburg, Camp County
 Sissy Spacek, Quitman, Wood County
 William B. Travis, famous commander at the Alamo, settled in Anahuac, Chambers County
 Forest Whitaker, Longview, Gregg County

 Former United States Senators:
 Horace Chilton born near Tyler, Smith County
 Charles Allen Culberson settled in Gilmer, Upshur County and Jefferson, Marion County
 James W. Flanagan settled in Henderson, Rusk County
 Samuel B. Maxey settled in and practiced law in Paris, Lamar County
 John Henninger Reagan practiced law in Palestine and Henderson County
 Thomas Jefferson Rusk settled in Nacogdoches, Nacogdoches County, and was also a Chief Justice of the Supreme Court of the Republic of Texas
 Morris Sheppard born in Morris County
 Matthias Ward settled in Clarksville, Red River County and Jefferson, Marion County
 Louis Wigfall lived in Nacogdoches, Nacogdoches County and Marshall, Harrison County
 Ralph Yarborough born in Chandler, Henderson County

 Other former governors of Texas: 
 Thomas Mitchell Campbell, born in Rusk, Cherokee County
 Oscar Branch Colquitt, newspaper owner in Pittsburg, Camp County and in Morris County
 Price Daniel, born in Dayton, Liberty County
 James Pinckney Henderson, first governor of Texas, practiced law in San Augustine, San Augustine County
 William P. Hobby, born in Moscow, Polk County
 Jim Hogg, born in Rusk, Cherokee County
 Richard B. Hubbard, lived in Tyler, Smith County and Lindale, Smith County
 Allan Shivers, born in Lufkin, Angelina County
 Ross S. Sterling, born in Anahuac, Chambers County
 Mark White, born in Henderson, Rusk County
 George Tyler Wood, second governor of Texas, settled near Point Blank in Liberty County and San Jacinto County

See also 
 List of geographical regions in Texas
 List of Texas regions
 List of museums in East Texas
 East Texas Oil Field
 Houston
 Texas Country Music Hall of Fame
 Texas State Railroad
 Battle of the Piney Woods
 Southwest Junior College Conference
 First Monday Trade Days of Canton, Texas
 Golden Triangle (Texas)
 United States District Court for the Eastern District of Texas

References

Books 
 CHINQUA WHERE? The Spirit of Rural America, 1947-1955,  by Fred B. McKinley.
 Black Gold to Bluegrass: From the Oil Fields of Texas to Spindletop Farm of Kentucky,  by Fred B. McKinley and Greg Riley.
 Gone to Texas: Genealogical Abstracts from The Telegraph and Texas Register 1835-1841, compiled by Kevin Ladd.
 The EAST TEXAS SUNDAY DRIVE Book, by Bob Bowman .
 Wild Flowers of the Big Thicket, East Texas, and Western Louisiana, by Geyata Ajilvsgi .
 Two centuries in East Texas: A history of San Augustine County and surrounding territory from 1685 by George Louis Crocket (Author) 
 The Last Boom: The Exciting Saga of the Discovery of the Greatest Oil Field in America by James Anthony Clark (Author) and Michel T. Halbouty (Author) .

External links 

 
 East Texas Historical Association
 Sights of Interest in East Texas
 1840 Map of East Texas From East Texas Digital Archives and Collections
 Texas Heritage Society
 

Regions of Texas
Black Belt (U.S. region)
Louisiana Creole culture in Texas
Regions of the Southern United States
Social history of the United States